In organic chemistry, a hemiaminal (also carbinolamine) is a functional group or type of chemical compound that has a hydroxyl group and an amine attached to the same carbon atom: . R can be hydrogen or an alkyl group. Hemiaminals are intermediates in imine formation from an amine and a carbonyl by alkylimino-de-oxo-bisubstitution.  Hemiaminals can be viewed as a blend of aminals and geminal diol. They are a special case of amino alcohols.

Classification according to amine precursor

Addition of ammonia

The adducts formed by the addition of ammonia to aldehydes have long been studied.  Compounds containing both a primary amino group and a hydroxyl group bonded to the same carbon atom are rare. They are invoked but rarely observed as intermediates in the reaction of ammonia and aldehydes and ketones. One example of this rare functionality is the adduct of ammonia and hexafluoroacetone, .

The C-substituted derivatives are obtained by reaction of aldehydes and ammonia:
3 RCHO  +  3 NH3   -> (RCHNH)3  +  3 H2O

Addition of primary amines
N-substituted derivatives are somewhat stable. These N,N',N''-trisubstituted hexahydro-1,3,5-triazines arise from the condensation of the amine and formaldehyde as illustrated by the route to 1,3,5-trimethyl-1,3,5-triazacyclohexane:
3 CH2O  +  3 H2NMe   ->  (CH2NMe)3  +  3 H2O

Although adducts generated from primary amines or ammonia are usually unstable, the hemiaminals have been trapped in a cavity.

Addition of secondary amines: carbinolamines (hemiaminals) and bisaminomethanes
One of the simplest reactions entails condensation of formaldehyde and dimethylamine.  This reaction produces first the carbinolamine (a hemiaminal) and bis(dimethylamino)methane:
Me2NH  +  CH2O  ->  Me2NCH2OH
Me2NH  +  Me2NCH2OH  ->  Me2NCH2NMe2  +  H2O

The reaction of  formaldehyde with  carbazole, which is weakly basic, proceed similarly:

Again, this carbinol converts readily to the methylene-linked bis(carbazole).

Hemiaminal ethers
Hemiaminal ethers have the following structure: R‴-C(NR'2)(OR")-R⁗. The glycosylamines are examples of cyclic hemiaminal ethers.

Use in total synthesis
Hemiaminal formation is a key step in an asymmetric total synthesis of saxitoxin:

In this reaction step the alkene group is first oxidized to an intermediate acyloin by action of osmium(III) chloride, oxone (sacrificial catalyst) and sodium carbonate (base).

See also
Aminal
Alkanolamine
Hemiacetal

References 

Functional groups